Hazard is a home rule-class city in, and the county seat of, Perry County, Kentucky, United States. The population was 5,263 at the 2020 Census.

History

Local landowner Elijah Combs Sr. laid out the town in 1824 as the planned seat of the newly established Perry County. Both the town and the county were named for Cdre. Oliver Hazard Perry, a commander in the 1813 Battle of Lake Erie in the War of 1812. The post office was initially known as Perry Court House but the name was officially changed to Hazard in 1854. The city was formally incorporated by the state assembly in 1884.

Long isolated by the surrounding mountains, Hazard was opened to the outside world by the arrival of the railroad in 1912. The only access to the valley had previously been 45 miles down the North Fork of the Kentucky River or a two-week trip over the surrounding mountains. The railroad brought boom times to the town, but the Great Depression saw prosperity end as quickly as it had begun.

The song "High Sheriff of Hazard" was written by Tom Paxton in reference to a coal miner's strike in 1964.

In 1981, several cast members of the television series The Dukes of Hazzard, including Catherine Bach, James Best, Sorrell Booke and Rick Hurst, visited Hazard during its Black Gold Festival. Soon afterwards, the series' stars Tom Wopat and John Schneider made appearances in Hazard.

After several decades of population decline, the city has seen a rapid increase of new residents as the growth rate approached 20% between 2010 and 2020. In July 1999, Hazard was the first stop on President Bill Clinton's tour of poverty-stricken communities that had failed to share in the boom of the 1990s.  Hillary Clinton visited Hazard on November 2, 2008, at a political rally for Democratic U.S. Senate candidate Bruce Lunsford.

Geography
Hazard is located at  (37.255910, −83.193706).

Climate
The climate in this area is characterized by hot, humid summers and generally mild to cool winters.  According to the Köppen Climate Classification system, Hazard has a humid subtropical climate, abbreviated "Cfa" on climate maps.

Demographics

As of the census of 2021, there were 5,263 people, and 2,046 households. The racial makeup of the city was 78.4% White, 16.57% African American, 0.08% Native American, 2.07% Asian, 0.15% from other races, and 0.87% from two or more races. Hispanic or Latino of any race were 0.86% of the population.

In 2000, there were 1,946 households, out of which 30.2% had children under the age of 18 living with them, 42.9% were married couples living together, 18.3% had a female householder with no husband present, and 34.9% were non-families. Of all households, 31.7% were made up of individuals, and 13.7% had someone living alone who was 65 years of age or older. The average household size was 2.30 and the average family size was 2.88.

In the city, the population was spread out, with 21.9% under the age of 18, 8.5% from 18 to 24, 28.0% from 25 to 44, 23.9% from 45 to 64, and 17.7% who were 65 years of age or older. The median age was 39 years. For every 100 females, there were 85.6 males. For every 100 females age 18 and over, there were 82.3 males.

The median income for a household in the city was $20,690, and the median income for a family was $27,226. Males had a median income of $34,398 versus $22,386 for females. The per capita income for the city was $14,782. About 30.9% of families and 30.5% of the population were below the poverty line, including 44.3% of those under age 18 and 13.9% of those age 65 or over.

Education
 Hazard Community and Technical College
 Hazard Independent Schools – a school district that serves the city; operates one elementary school, one middle school, and one high school
 Hazard High School
 Perry County Schools – operates six elementary schools, one K–12 school, one high school, and one alternative school
 Hazard Christian Academy

Hazard has a lending library, the Perry County Public Library.

Media

Television
WYMT-TV, a semi-satellite of CBS affiliate WKYT-TV in Lexington
WKHA, a satellite station of Kentucky Educational Television

Radio

 WSGS
 WKIC
 WZQQ
 WJMD
 WEKH, a satellite station of WEKU
 WQXY
 WLZD-LP

Newspapers
 Hazard Herald
 Perry County Advocate

Notable people

People who were born in or residents of Hazard include:

References

Further reading

External links

 

Appalachian culture in Kentucky
Cities in Kentucky
Cities in Perry County, Kentucky
Coal towns in Kentucky
County seats in Kentucky